Erica ciliaris is a species of heather, known in the British Isles as Dorset heath.

Distribution
Erica ciliaris has a Lusitanian distribution, stretching from Morocco in the south, along the Atlantic coasts of Portugal, Spain and France to south-western parts of the British Isles in the north. In the British Isles, it is only found natively in Dorset, Devon, Cornwall and one location in County Galway, where it lives in bogs and wet heaths. It has also been introduced to Hampshire. E. ciliaris was voted the county flower of Dorset in 2002 following a poll by the wild flora conservation charity Plantlife.

References

ciliaris
Flora of Morocco
Flora of Southwestern Europe
Flora of Ireland
Flora of England
Plants described in 1753
Taxa named by Carl Linnaeus